Fatime N'diane (born 14 September 1976) is a Senegalese former basketball player who competed in the 2000 Summer Olympics. She was born in Dakar.

References

1976 births
Living people
Basketball players from Dakar
Senegalese women's basketball players
Olympic basketball players of Senegal
Basketball players at the 2000 Summer Olympics